Amalia Herédia Livermore (3 March 1830 – 16 October 1902) was a Spanish patron, collector, researcher, and philanthropist, as well as a promoter of arts and culture.

Early years and education 
Amalia Heredia Livermore was born in Málaga, 1830. She was the tenth daughter of the industrialist Manuel Agustín Heredia Martínez and Isabel Livermore Salas. From childhood, she received a careful education of Catholic roots typical of the bourgeoisie of the time. She grew up in a refined environment that would encourage her love of the fine arts and included numerous trips abroad. She became a cultured and intelligent woman.

Career
She married Marquis Jorge Loring Oyarzábal in 1850. He was a business entrepreneur. They had nine children.

After marriage, she transformed her residence in La Concepción, Málaga, into a botanical garden, thereby establishing Jardín Botánico La Concepción with her husband. She stood out for her philanthropy with several projects in Malaga including, assisting with the financing necessary to build the Hospital de San Julián together with others, placing the first stone during the construction of the Civil Hospital (1862), and establishing the College of Asunción.

Heredia Livermore and her husband acquired the tables of Lex Malacitana in order to start an archaeological collection, the Loringiano Museum. She was one of the founding partners of the Royal Spanish Society of Natural History. She was also a dame of the Order of Queen Maria Luisa.

When the Sexenio Democrático occurred, the couple supported the monarchist-liberal movement and moved to Madrid shortly before the Bourbon restoration. They were friends of the politician Antonio Cánovas del Castillo, who was a distant relative of hers.

Oyarzábal died in 1900 and she died as well two years later. They were buried in the Heredia family vault in the Cemetery of San Miguel de Málaga.

References

Bibliography
 DÍAZ DE ESCOVAR, N. Galería de Malagueñas. Apuntes para una obra biográfica de las mujeres, hijas de esta provincia, o residentes en ella, que se han distinguido por su talento, piedad, valor e ilustración. Málaga, La Equitativa, 1901. (in Spanish)
 SÁENZ DE MELGAR, F. (dir.), Las mujeres españolas, americanas y lusitanas pintadas por sí mismas. Estudio completo de la mujer en todas las esferas sociales. Barcelona, Ed. Juan Pons, 1881. (in Spanish)
 RAMOS FRENDO, Eva. Maria. Amalia Heredia Livermore, Marquesa de Casa-Loring, Málaga. Servicio de publicaciones de la Universidad de Málaga, 2000. (in Spanish)

External links 
 Cementerio Histórico deSan Miguel at Ayuntamiento de Málaga

1830 births
1902 deaths
19th-century Spanish women
People from Málaga
Spanish collectors
Spanish philanthropists
19th-century philanthropists
Women collectors
19th-century women philanthropists